Auckland City Council was the local government authority for Auckland City, New Zealand, from 1871 to 1 November 2010, when it and Auckland's six other city and district councils were amalgamated to form the Auckland Council. It was an elected body representing the 404,658 residents (2006 census) of the city, which included some of the Hauraki Gulf islands, such as Waiheke Island and Great Barrier Island. It was chaired by the Mayor of Auckland City.

Elections 
The councillors and the mayor of Auckland City were elected every three years. In the 2007 elections, the voter turnout was 39.4%, down from 48% in 2004 and 43% in 2001.

Functions 

Amongst its other functions, the city council administered more than 700 parks and reserves throughout the country (2008 data). It also had, amongst other things, 2214 km of footpaths, though these were often in bad condition (30% being rated as "poor" or "very poor" quality), a matter often discussed in the media, especially after the 2008 elected council chose to reduce the annual upgrade budget by NZ$39 million to $218 million and reduced the budget for new footpaths from NZ$39.5 million to $5.7 million, as part of their campaign to reduce rates increases.

Auckland City, as part of its landscaping programmes, had planted more than 103,000 trees since 2002, with about 16,000 new trees in 2008, a rate that was estimated at about four times the trimming and removal rate of public and private trees.

Finances 
In the financial year ending June 2007, Auckland City Council had operating revenue of NZ$552 million, of which 68% came from Council rates, which were NZ$859 per ratepayer on average. It expended NZ$343 million on capital projects, of which 45% went to 'transport' expenses, 19% to 'property and asset management' and 17% to 'open spaces, parks and streetscapes', while 10% were spent on 'stormwater and waste management'. Another 7% were spent on 'arts and culture' and 2% on 'zoo, recreational facilities and community development'. The operating surplus was NZ$40.3 million.

Controversies 
In 2002 then mayor John Banks announced plans to sell 1570 of its 1700 pensioner flats. A coalition called Council Housing Action Group (CHAG) fought the privatisation. Initially Banks sought to sell the flats on the private market, and the coalition protests included disrupting private auctions. While the coalition was unable to prevent the sell-off, they achieved a substantial “compromise” where the flats were not sold off privately but instead sold to Housing New Zealand. All 1542 pensioner flats and 129 residential houses owned by Auckland City Council were sold to Housing NZ for $83million in 2002-3. The "book value" for all was $132million at the time of sale.

References

Further reading 
 
 
 

 
City councils in New Zealand